Khalid Jaberti is an Ethiopian born-Qatari football player.

References

Living people
1984 births
Ethiopian footballers
Qatari footballers
Naturalised citizens of Qatar
Al-Sailiya SC players
Al-Rayyan SC players
Al-Khor SC players
Qatar SC players
Al-Arabi SC (Qatar) players
Umm Salal SC players
Al Kharaitiyat SC players
Mesaimeer SC players
Qatar Stars League players
Qatari Second Division players
Association football fullbacks